Curt Wiese is an American football head football coach at the University of Minnesota Duluth, a position he has held since December 21, 2012, after he was promoted from offensive coordinator. In 2013, he was awarded the Liberty Mutual Coach of the Year Award for NCAA Division II. Prior to his arrival at Duluth, Wiese served as head coach at Marietta from 2006 to 2007 where he compiled an overall record of nine wins and eleven losses (9–11).

Head coaching record

References

External links
 Minnesota–Duluth profile

Year of birth missing (living people)
Living people
Marietta Pioneers football coaches
Minnesota Duluth Bulldogs football coaches
Minnesota State Mavericks football players
Wisconsin–Eau Claire Blugolds football coaches
Wisconsin–Stevens Point Pointers football players
People from Stoughton, Wisconsin

Minnesota State University, Mankato alumni